Likha Saaya (born ) is an Indian politician from the state of Arunachal Pradesh.

Saaya was elected unopposed from the Yachuli seat in the 2014 Arunachal Pradesh Legislative Assembly election, standing as a People's Party of Arunachal candidate.

See also
Arunachal Pradesh Legislative Assembly

References

External links
 Likha Saaya profile
 MyNeta Profile
 Likha Saaya FB

People's Party of Arunachal politicians
Indian National Congress politicians
Living people
Arunachal Pradesh MLAs 2014–2019
Year of birth missing (living people)
1970s births